Noble Causes is an American comic book series created and written by Jay Faerber, illustrated by a variety of artists  and published by Image Comics.

The series follows the lives of the Nobles, a wealthy superhero family in the Image Universe. The stories focus less on the Nobles fighting supervillains and more on their personal lives. Originally intended to be an ongoing title, it was downgraded into a series of miniseries and one-shots. It finally became an ongoing title in 2004.

Beginning with issue #32, the series jumped five years after the previous storyline. At this point, the characters Gaia, Race and Liz are no longer active part in the family, while Doc's new wife, Olympia, and her two children joined the Noble family.

The series concluded in 2008 with the publication of issue #40.

Cast of characters

The Nobles

Dr. Dudley "Doc" Noble: Patriarch of the Noble family. A two-fisted scientist seemingly more at ease with machines than with other people, Doc will nevertheless go to any lengths he deems necessary to defend his family. He has access to a vast supply of advanced weaponry and equipment, which he can access with simple verbal commands (e.g. "Gun" brings him an energy gun; "Jet Pack" brings him a jet pack, etc.) Doc was initially married to Gaia, but divorced her after discovering her involvement in a monster that terrorized the city. He later married Olympia, but experienced difficulties when he discovered that he still had feelings for Gaia. Olympia left Doc with an ultimatum of choosing either her or Gaia. The series ends with Doc making a phone call to an unknown woman telling her that she's the one he "wants to be with".
Gaia Noble: The family matriarch. A sorceress from another dimension who can command the four classical elements, Gaia is also incredibly media savvy and is responsible for positioning the Noble family into the public spotlight. She’s extremely concerned with how things look to the public and goes to great lengths to ensure that the family's image remains intact. When the Blackthornes began to gain more attention than the Noble family, Gaia unleashed a monster for her family to fight and once again gain the public spotlight. This later backfired when Liz regained her memories, which included seeing Gaia give the monster instructions. As a result, Gaia and Doc divorced and Gaia spent multiple years in jail. Upon her release Gaia informed Doc that she intended to win back his heart.
Russell "Rusty" Noble: Doc and Gaia's first-born child, Rusty's brain was placed in a robotic body due to a battle with a robotic assassin that would have otherwise killed him. Rusty dislikes being in the public spotlight, which contributed to his eventual divorce with Celeste Noble. He later dates Cosmic Rae, a young woman with magnetic abilities that was secretly an android. Upon discovering this, Rusty tried to find the "real Rae". His mission led him to a robotics genius who was a federal witness. The ensuing battle ended with a number of police officers being injured and the deaths of a news helicopter crew. Rusty spent some time in jail and was eventually freed, where he resumed working with the current roster of Nobles. Five years in the future it is shown that Rusty has become a seemingly emotionless being, only showing emotion when Frost is injured and when the widow of the man he killed attempts revenge.
Frost: Gaia's son from an extramarital affair and the black sheep of the family. Aside from Gaia, each member of the family treats him with varying degrees of scorn. To the general public, Frost is something of an urban legend. He lives in seclusion in a large ice castle near the Aurora Borealis. Frost has the power of cold manipulation as well as the ability to transform into a cool mist, and always has an agenda when it comes to the Nobles (except for Gaia, to whom he's extremely loyal). He even went so far as to have an affair with Celeste while she was married to Rusty. He often hires himself out as a troubleshooter, even doing jobs for the U.S and Canadian governments. It was revealed that his father was actually a parallel universe version of "Doc".
Race Noble: Doc and Gaia's second-born son. Smart, handsome and charming, super-fast Race is considered the "golden boy" of the family. In the original miniseries, he was killed off while on his honeymoon. At the end of Noble Causes: Distant Relatives #4, he was returned to life in a twist similar to Bobby Ewing's resurrection. Now, he is the target of a revenge plot formulated by the Blackthornes, the Nobles' criminal counterparts. Years ago, during a fight between the two families, Race was battling Pierce Blackthorne when a misstep caused Pierce to fall to his death. Race failed to save Pierce and therefore was blamed by Hunter Blackthorne. The event haunts Race to this day. A recent attack by the super-powered assassin Widowmaker has robbed him of his super-speed abilities.
Elizabeth "Liz" Donnelly-Noble: Race's wife and the only normal member of the family. An ordinary Georgetown bookseller, she met Race when he disrupted a signing at her bookstore. Possessing no super-powers or exotic background, Liz is the proverbial stranger in a strange land. Her only special gifts are common sense and a willingness to speak her mind. On more than one occasion, she has shown that she can go toe-to-toe verbally with any member of the family, particularly Celeste. Liz was recently the assumed target of the Blackthorne family's revenge plot. A mishap occurred in the experiment intended to restore Race's powers, causing her to be hit with a tachyon stream and vanish. While travelling along the tachyon stream, she visited a number of alternate futures. Afterwards, she awoke in the present with amnesia, unable to remember the Nobles.
Zephyr Noble: Doc and Gaia's only daughter, and their youngest child. She has the power of air manipulation, and can be considered the wild child of the family, having once made a sex tape which was subsequently released on the internet. She later revealed to Liz that this tape was filmed while an innocent girl was being held at gunpoint, but due to the emotional damage Zephyr began a pattern of self-destructive behaviour which culminated in her becoming pregnant as the result of a tryst with her family's nemesis Draconis. Recently, she gave birth, but the baby was stillborn... or so she was led to believe. In reality, the doctor was paid by Necrona Blackthorne to help kidnap the baby. To escape from pressure caused by her public life, she has adopted an alternate persona (ironically enough, the prostitute that dressed up as her for Krennick). Zephyr often hangs out with Invincible, Shadowhawk and Firebreather. Eventually, as of issue #32, she was able to win Slate's affection, marrying him and turning her husband to the side of the angels.
Celeste Noble: Rusty's ex-wife, a publicity-hungry diva who possesses stellar energy-based powers. Undergoing extensive cosmetic surgery and receiving her powers from a think tank known as the Winterbourne Institute, Celeste attracted Rusty's attention by staging fights with supervillains she herself hired. Celeste seems to have married into the family more for the status than for love. She even dallied with Frost behind Rusty's back. It's been revealed that Celeste, much to her own surprise, has genuinely fallen in love with Dawn Blackthorne, with whom she's been pursuing a clandestine lesbian relationship. Her relationship with Dawn ends after Celeste kills Kitty, Dawn's mother, out of pity, believing her condition could not be cured.
Olympia Noble: Doc's second wife. Appeared in issue #32 as the second wife of Doc, she's superhumanly strong and beautiful, with an outgoing personality.
Minutiae: Olympia's geeky daughter. She has powers similar to the DC Comics heroes The Atom and Atom Girl in that she can alter her own mass and size, shrinking to subatomic level. She shares the same interest in science as Doc, helping him with his inventions.
Surge: Olympia's son. He is the classical "angry young man" who would disagree with Doc if Doc told him rain was wet, a Johnny Storm-like hothead with energy-based powers.
Slate Blackthorne: The youngest of the Blackthorne family. Able to transform into a super-strong rock-like form with incredible resistance to harm, Slate has no real desire to follow in his family's footsteps, so he secretly performs good deeds (e.g. hiding Widowmaker in a safehouse under the pretense that he killed her). He is Zephyr's next door neighbor. Initially, both were unaware of each other's alter-ego. As of issue #32 they married, and finally Slate becomes able to leave his villainous ways to be the hero he wanted to.

The Blackthornes
Hunter Blackthorne: A dark sorcerer, and patriarch of the Blackthorne family. Just released on parole, Hunter is plotting an elaborate revenge scheme against Race, whom he blames for the death of his son Pierce. That plan resulted in Race losing his super-speed and the public now viewing the Blackthornes as being reformed. After Kitty's death, he accepted Race's offer to reunite him with her and Pierce in an alternate reality.
Katherine "Kitty" Blackthorne: The matriarch of the Blackthorne family. In order to bolster her natural feral abilities, she drank a special elixir of Hunter's creation. If she took too much, she would mutate into a savage cat-like beast. Unfortunately, she developed an addiction to it. In her cat-beast form, she terrorized the streets of Crowns Pointe at night. Eventually, the elixir became part of her system and she was transforming without it. A cure was created, but too late as, after a rampage, she begged Celeste to end her misery. Reluctantly, Celeste decapitated Kitty with a stellar energy blast.
Mercury Blackthorne: The oldest of the Blackthorne children. After Pierce, Mercury's younger brother, died, he became mute. Mercury can alter his body's density from diamond-hard to intangible. He is the first member of the Blackthorne family to actually appear in the comic (issue #4 of the ongoing).
Necrona Blackthorne: Krennick's long-lost half-sister, current ruler of the Underworld and secretly Mercury's wife. It was revealed that Draconis had often ordered any daughters he had sired to be immediately put to death. Necrona's mother managed to spirit her away to a distant part of the Underworld. She made herself known when Krennick was suspected of murdering Gretchen Lewis. She kidnapped Zephyr's baby under the pretense that it was stillborn, raising it as her own. Like many of her people, Necrona possesses superhuman strength and durability, in addition to the ability to project fire from her hands.
Dusk and Dawn Blackthorne: Twins who can manipulate darkness and light manipulation respectively. Dusk resents Dawn, who, in her eyes, is the family favorite. She has also shown rather impulsive behavior, such as when she ambushed Zephyr Noble in the neighborhood she recently moved into. Dawn, on the other hand, values her family and her love life and keeps them very close to the vest. She works hard to keep her family together although she sometimes struggles to protect her secret lesbian relationship with Celeste Noble, which has since ended due to Celeste's mercy killing of Kitty.

Supporting cast
Krennick: Son of Draconis, ruler of the Underworld, a subterranean realm. Once an enemy of the Nobles alongside his father, he and Race became friends after both men were trapped in an alternate dimension for a year. Krennick became a surrogate member of the Noble family. Infatuated with Zephyr, he had a casual relationship with her stripper doppelgänger Gretchen Lewis, calling her by Zephyr's name and having her wear a red-haired wig, before her murder by one of Krennick's generals. The revelation of Krennick's predilections has strained his friendships with both Zephyr and Race. After the discovery of the true murderer, Krennick turned rulership of the Underworld over to his newfound sister Necrona. Like many of his people, Krennick possesses superhuman strength and durability, in addition to the ability to project fire from his hands. He is also a highly skilled warrior.
Clarion: Gaia's friend and confidant. Seen in a number of back-up stories, it was Clarion who raised Frost alongside her own son. Very little is known about Clarion, including whatever powers she may possess. It is possible that she may hail from the same dimension as Gaia.
Cosmic Rae: An African-American superheroine, Rusty begins dating soon after his divorce from Celeste. Rae can control magnetism, including manipulating metals which are susceptible to that force. While on a mission in space, it is discovered by Frost that Rae is actually a robot. Frost keeps her secret in exchange for her doing him a favor in the future. Rusty recently assaulted Rae upon discovering this, ripping one of her arms off in the process. Doc secretly revealed to Gaia that he created Rae so that Rusty could have someone to love.
Detective Ryan O'Mega: A detective in the superhuman crimes division of the Crown Pointe police department. O'Mega has various forms of superhuman vision (infrared, ultraviolet, X-ray, etc.). The downside is he needs special glasses to keep his vision powers in check, or they overwhelm him. After investigating the murder of Gretchen Lewis, he briefly became romantically involved with Zephyr.

Collected editions
The various releases are being collected into a number of trade paperbacks.

Vol. 1: In Sickness and In Health
Race introduces Liz to the family for dinner. After a huge skirmish, Liz retreats to the bathroom, shaken by what she witnessed. Some time later, Race and Liz' wedding comes. Soon after, while on their honeymoon, Race is killed by a laser beam from the sky. Meanwhile, Zephyr discovers she's pregnant and Rusty discovers Celeste and Frost's affair when he catches them together in the shower. It is revealed that Icarus, the family’s loyal robot servant, had murdered Race and severely injured Rusty, in order to reshape the family into what he thought Doc wanted it to be.

Volume collects Noble Causes 4-issue mini-series and Noble Causes: First Impressions.

Vol. 2: Family Secrets
Picking up the pieces after their ordeal at the hands of Icarus, the Nobles are again rocked by scandal when Zephyr's pregnancy becomes public. Meanwhile, Rusty throws Celeste out of their home for sleeping with Frost. Frost uses information he has concerning Zephyr's baby as leverage for Gaia to reveal who his father is. Rusty goes through a number of superheroes he believes to be the father of Zephyr's baby. The father is revealed to be Draconis, whom Doc kills at the end of the story. Celeste serves Rusty with divorce papers and Gaia finally tells Frost who his father is.

Volume collects Noble Causes: Family Secrets 4-issue mini-series.

Vol. 3: Distant Relatives
Frost goes off on a search for his true father, who turns out to be an alternate-reality version of Doc. In that reality, the Nobles are fugitives from the law. Meanwhile, Rusty, hurting after his divorce, finds love again when he meets Cosmic Rae. Liz has followed Frost on his search, looking for an alternate version of Race, who turns out to be rather amoral. After the death of his father, Krennick has become ruler of the Underworld, quite reluctantly. When Zephyr discovers that Krennick hires prostitutes to impersonate her, she becomes disgusted and tells Krennick to stay away from her. When Frost meets up with Liz, he decides to send her to another alternate reality — one where Race is alive but her own counterpart is dead.

Volume collects Noble Causes: Distant Relatives 4-issue mini-series.

Vol. 4: Blood & Water
A prostitute named Gretchen Lewis is discovered lying dead in an alley, dressed as Zephyr. Det. Omega is heading the investigation and Krennick is the prime suspect. Meanwhile, Rusty and Cosmic Rae embark on a government-sponsored mission to rescue a team of scientists from another planet. Unfortunately, Celeste and Frost are part of the mission as well. Gretchen's killer turns out to be Diakun, Krennick's advisor. Doc goes to visit Steven Dockerty, a man so obsessed with Gaia that he once tried to assassinate the president of the United States in order to impress her. He returns a different man.

Volume collects issues #1-6.

Vol. 5: Betrayals
Rusty, Celeste, Frost, Rae and the other heroes are still stranded on the alien world, which is later revealed to be the dimension Gaia hails from. Steven Dockerty escapes from the mental institution where he was being kept and heads straight for Noble Manor. But things are not as they appear. As it turns out, Dockerty switched bodies with Doc with the cooperation of a warlock. When the entire family arrives in Gaia's home dimension, the spell is reversed and the heroes return home. As a consolation, Gaia's father, the ruler of the dimension, is given Dockerty as a prisoner. Zephyr finally gives birth to her baby. Unfortunately, what should be a time of great joy becomes a tragedy when the baby is stillborn...or so the Nobles are led to believe.

Volume collects issues #7-12, plus The Pact volume 2 #2.

Vol. 6: Hidden Agendas
Hunter Blackthorne has just made parole, much to the chagrin of the Nobles, particularly Doc and Race. Once he is home, he and the family set an insidious revenge plot in motion. Their target: Liz Noble. Zephyr attempts to live a normal life, following the apparent death of her baby. Meanwhile, Celeste is involved in a secret affair with Dawn Blackthorne.

Volume collects issues #13-18 plus Frost short story "Snow Job" from Image Holiday Special 2005".

Vol. 7: Powerless
Volume collects issues #19-25.

Vol. 8: Star Crossed
The lives of the Nobles and the Blackthornes continue to intertwine as Zephyr Noble and Slate Blackthorne enter into a secret affair, and the terminally ill Kitty Blackthorne makes an unthinkable request of Celeste.

Volume 8 collects issues #26-31.

Vol. 9: Five Years Later
Jumping five years after the events of the previous story, Doc Noble has rededicated the Noble family to be the world's preeminent superheroes, but even as they take a more pro-active approach to fighting crime on a global scale, they still harbor dark secrets and hidden agendas.

Volume 9 collects issues #32-36.

Vol. 10: Ever After

Long-kept secrets are revealed in the final volume of the Noble Causes saga as Image Comics’ most dysfunctional superhero family returns for their last collection of adventures. 

Volume 10 collects issues #37-40.

Noble Causes: Extended Family
Two-issue series.

Noble Causes Archives Vol.1
Collects volumes 1 through 5 (black & white)

Noble Causes Archives Vol.2
Collects volumes 6 through 10 and Noble Causes: Extended Family (black & white)

Read orderNoble Causes Vol 1: In Sickness and in Health Noble Causes Vol 2: Family SecretsNoble Causes Extended Family 1Noble Causes Vol 3: Distant Relatives Noble Causes Extended Family 2Noble Causes Vol 4: Blood & WaterNoble Causes Vol 5: BetrayalsNoble Causes Vol 6: Hidden AgendasNoble Causes Vol 7: PowerlessNoble Causes Vol 8: Star CrossedNoble Causes Vol 9: Five Years LaterNoble Causes Vol 10: Ever AfterOther appearances
The Nobles make a cameo appearance at Captain Dynamo's funeral in Dynamo 5 #1.
The Nobles also make a more eventful appearance in Dynamo 5 #13 when Augie Ford of F.L.A.G. calls the Nobles to aid the Dynamo 5's mentor Maddie Warner, after she has fallen into a coma. He again appears in Dynamo 5 #17 when she is brought out of her coma.
Zephyr Noble appears in the second volume of The Pact'', a book about a team of superhero teens of which she is a member.

Notes

References

Noble Causes at the Big Comic Book DataBase

External links
Official Noble Causes website

Jay Faerber's web site
Noble Causes Covers

Interviews
An Original "Cause": Jay Faerber talks "Noble Causes". Comic Book Resources. December 23, 2004
Jay Faerber Fights For His "Noble Causes". Comic Book Resources. April 6, 2006
JAY FAERBER ON NOBLE CAUSES' 5 YEAR JUMP, September 10, 2007

Reviews
Review of Noble Causes v4: Blood & Water, at Comics Bulletin
Review of Noble Causes v5: Betrayal, at Comics Bulletin
Review of Noble Causes v6: Hidden Agendas, at Comics Bulletin

2002 comics debuts
Fictional families
Image Comics superhero teams
Image Comics superheroes
Image Comics titles